The Nokia 3.1 is a Nokia-branded entry-level Android smartphone released in May 2018 by HMD Global. It is the successor to Nokia 3. It was launched with Android 8.0 "Oreo", which could be updated to Android 10. The phone is part of Google's Android One program.

Design 
The phone uses a MediaTek MT6750N system-on-chip, containing an octa-core 1.5 GHz ARM Cortex-A53 central processing unit and an ARM Mali-T860 MP2 GPU. The phone has a 2990 mAh Li-ion battery, a 13 megapixel rear camera with an LED flash, and an 8 megapixel front camera. It has an IPS LCD capacitive touchscreen with an 18:9 aspect ratio.

The phone comes with two types of models: a 2GB RAM variant with 16 GB storage, and a 3GB RAM variant with 32 GB storage.

The device was initially shipped with Android Oreo. An update to Android Pie was released in June 2019. Its latest security update was for August 2021.

Reception 
The Nokia 3.1 received mixed reviews. Andrew Williams of TechRadar praised the phone’s design, screen quality and "effective HDR" while criticising the "poor performance and storage".

References

External links
 Official Nokia 3.1 website

3.1
Mobile phones introduced in 2018
Discontinued smartphones